The 2004–05 season was the second year of the Elite One Championship, the top-level rugby league French Championship.

This was the second year of operation after the previous (1958–2002) National League 1 had been split into two divisions, Elite One and Elite Two. For the 2004–05 season, the same 10 clubs that competed in the Elite One 2003–04 season returned, as no clubs were relegated to, nor promoted from, Elite Two. At the end of this 2004–05 season, the first relegations and promotions took place, with 11 clubs competing in the  Elite One 2005–06 season.

Table 

Note: (C) = champions, (R) = relegated

Grand Final

See also 
 Rugby league in France
 French Rugby League Championship
 Elite One Championship III

References

Rugby league competitions in France
2005 in French rugby league
2004 in French rugby league